Songs and Other Things is an album by Tom Verlaine. It was engineered in and around New York City by Patrick A. Derivaz, Wayne Dorell, Fred Smith, Mario Salvati, and Larry 7.

Track listing
All songs written by Tom Verlaine.
 "A Parade in Littleton"
 "Heavenly Charm"
 "Orbit"
 "Blue Light"
 "From Her Fingers"
 "Nice Actress"
 "A Stroll"
 "The Earth is in the Sky"
 "Lovebird Asylum Seeker"
 "Documentary"
 "Shingaling"
 "All Weirded Out"
 "The Day on You"
 "Peace Piece"

Personnel
Tom Verlaine - guitars, vocals
Patrick A. Derivaz - bass tracks 2-5, 7-9
Fred Smith - bass track 1
Tony Shanahan - bass track 12
Louie Appel - drums tracks 2-9
Graham Hawthorne - drums tracks 10, 11, 13
Jay Dee Daugherty - drums tracks 1, 12
Jimmy Rip - rhythm guitar track 12

References

External links
The Wonder - Songs And Other Things

Tom Verlaine albums
2006 albums